Gee Creek is a stream in the U.S. state of Florida. It is a tributary to Soldier Creek.

Gee Creek was named after Henry Gee, a local landowner.

References

Rivers of Florida
Rivers of Seminole County, Florida